Gregory Melvin Westbrooks (born February 24, 1953) is a former professional American football player who played as a linebacker for the New Orleans Saints, Oakland Raiders, St. Louis Cardinals, and Los Angeles Rams for a combined total of 7 seasons.

1953 births
Living people
American football linebackers
Colorado Buffaloes football players
Colorado Mesa Mavericks football players
New Orleans Saints players
St. Louis Cardinals (football) players
Oakland Raiders players
Los Angeles Rams players
Players of American football from Chicago